The enzyme dihydroxyfumarate decarboxylase catalyzes the chemical reaction

dihydroxyfumarate  tartronate semialdehyde + CO2

This enzyme belongs to the family of lyases, specifically the carboxy-lyases, which cleave carbon-carbon bonds.  The systematic name of this enzyme class is dihydroxyfumarate carboxy-lyase (tartronate-semialdehyde-forming). This enzyme is also called dihydroxyfumarate carboxy-lyase. This enzyme participates in glyoxylate and dicarboxylate metabolism.

References

 

EC 4.1.1
Enzymes of unknown structure